Juan Manuel Herbella (born May 3, 1978), is a former Argentine footballer.

Herbella was born in Buenos Aires, Argentina.

Teams
  Vélez Sársfield 1998-2000
  Nueva Chicago 2000-2002
  Colón de Santa Fe 2002-2003
  Quilmes 2003-2004
  Internacional 2004
  Barcelona 2005
  Argentinos Juniors 2005-2006
  Godoy Cruz de Mendoza 2006-2007
  Gimnasia y Esgrima de Jujuy 2007-2008
  Unión Atlético Maracaibo 2008
  Quilmes 2009-2010
  Ferro Carril Oeste 2010-2011

References
 

1978 births
Living people
Footballers from Buenos Aires
Argentine footballers
Argentine expatriate footballers
Gimnasia y Esgrima de Jujuy footballers
Argentinos Juniors footballers
Club Atlético Colón footballers
Nueva Chicago footballers
Godoy Cruz Antonio Tomba footballers
Quilmes Atlético Club footballers
Club Atlético Vélez Sarsfield footballers
Ferro Carril Oeste footballers
Expatriate footballers in Brazil
Expatriate footballers in Ecuador
Expatriate footballers in Venezuela
Association footballers not categorized by position